Zion United Methodist Cemetery is a cemetery located in Plumsted Township, in Ocean County, New Jersey, United States.

Notable interments
 David Southard (1845–1894) Civil War Congressional Medal of Honor recipient

External links
 

Cemeteries in Ocean County, New Jersey
Methodist cemeteries
Plumsted Township, New Jersey